Davon Anthony Drew (born December 9, 1985) is a former American football tight end. He was drafted by the Baltimore Ravens in the fifth round of the 2009 NFL Draft. He played college football at East Carolina where he played some quarterback before switching to tight end because of his size and speed. Drew was also a member of the Miami Dolphins.

External links
East Carolina Pirates bio

1985 births
Living people
Sportspeople from New Bern, North Carolina
Players of American football from North Carolina
American football tight ends
East Carolina Pirates football players
Baltimore Ravens players
Miami Dolphins players